Heart of Wales Line Trail is a long distance footpath, running 229 kilometres / 142 miles from Craven Arms to Llanelli.  It was opened in 2019 following four years of planning. The trail marker is a stylized image of a train crossing the Cynghordy Viaduct.

The route 
The trail links nearly all of the stations of the Heart of Wales Line allowing for easy car-free access.  Places on the route include Knighton, Builth Wells, Llandovery and Millennium Coastal Park.

Further reading
Les Lumsdon - The Heart of Wales Line Trail

External links

 Official Home Page
 Route on OpenStreetmap

Long-distance footpaths in Wales